Los Lonely Boys is the eponymous debut album by the American rock trio Los Lonely Boys, released originally by Or Music, and re-released in 2004 by Epic Records. It features their breakthrough single "Heaven", a number one hit on the Billboard Adult Contemporary charts. The album was certified 2× Platinum by the RIAA on February 22, 2005.

The song "Heaven" appears on the music game Karaoke Revolution Presents: American Idol and is also playable in Guitar Hero On Tour.

Track listing
All songs composed by Henry, Jojo, and Ringo Garza; co-writers in parentheses.
 "Señorita" – 4:10
 "Heaven" – 3:47
 "Crazy Dream" – 4:47
 "Dime Mi Amor"– 3:26
 "Hollywood" – 4:16
 "More Than Love" – 3:20
 "Nobody Else" (Kevin Wommack) – 4:42
 "Onda" – 8:55
 "Real Emotions" (Wommack) – 4:04
 "Tell Me Why" (Phil Roy) – 3:24
 "Velvet Sky" (Wommack) – 4:41
 "La Contestación" (Jim Tullio) – 5:47

Personnel
As listed in liner notes.

Los Lonely Boys
 Henry Garza - guitar, vocals
 Jojo Garza - bass, vocals
 Ringo Garza - drums, vocals

Additional musicians
 Eric Darken - percussion
 Willie Nelson - acoustic guitar ("La Contestación")
 John Porter - acoustic guitar ("More Than Love", "Velvet Sky", "La Contestación")
 Reese Wynans - piano, organ

Charts

Weekly charts

Year-end charts

Singles

References

Los Lonely Boys albums
2004 debut albums
Epic Records albums